Infonet College is a private tertiary education institution of higher learning in Addis Ababa, Ethiopia that trains in Information and Communication Technology. The institute was founded in 1995 by a team of professionals from the fields of Computer Science, Business and Social science.

The college offers both long and short term trainings and consultancy services on various fields. Infonet College born out of the Infonet Computer Center, a Private Limited Company established in 1994 in Ethiopia.

Universities and colleges in Ethiopia
1995 establishments in Ethiopia